The 2019 Paracanoe European Championships was held in Poznań, Poland, from 21 to 22 May 2019. This event, which is usually part of the Canoe Sprint European Championships, was held separately as the ECA chose not to organise said event because of the European Games.

Explanation of events
Paracanoe competitions are contested in either a va'a (V), an outrigger canoe (which includes a second pontoon) with a single-blade paddle, or in a kayak (K), a closed canoe with a double-bladed paddle. All international competitions are held over 200 metres in single-man boats, with three event classes in both types of vessel for men and women depending on the level of an athlete's impairment. The lower the classification number, the more severe the impairment is - for example, VL1 is a va'a competition for those with particularly severe impairments.

Medal summary

Medal table

Medal events
 Non-Paralympic classes

Notes

References

External links
Results website

Canoe Sprint European Championships
Canoe Sprint European Championships
European Sprint Championships
Paracanoe European Championships